Daniel Kevin Fogler (born October 20, 1976) is an American actor, comedian and writer. He has appeared in films including Balls of Fury, Good Luck Chuck, Fantastic Beasts and Where to Find Them, Fantastic Beasts: The Crimes of Grindelwald, and Fantastic Beasts: The Secrets of Dumbledore and has done voice acting for Kung Fu Panda, Horton Hears a Who!, and Mars Needs Moms. He appeared on The Walking Dead as Luke.

In 2005, Fogler made his Broadway debut as William Barfée in The 25th Annual Putnam County Spelling Bee, for which he won the Tony Award for Best Featured Actor in a Musical.

Early life and education
Fogler was the second child born to Shari and Richard Fogler, an English teacher and a surgeon, respectively, in Brooklyn, New York. Fogler is Jewish. He attended elementary school at the Windmill Montessori School in Brooklyn, NY. He graduated from Poly Prep Country Day School in 1994, before attending the School of Theatre at Boston University.

Career
Fogler made his Broadway debut when he originated the role of William Barfée in The 25th Annual Putnam County Spelling Bee, for which he won the Theatre World Award for the original off-Broadway production and the Tony Award for Best Featured Actor in a Musical in 2005 for the original Broadway production.

Fogler's first television appearance was in 2002 on Fox's 30 Seconds to Fame as a contestant impersonating Al Pacino. Other television credits include recurring roles on ABC's The Goldbergs, NBC's Hannibal, CBS's The Good Wife and voice work for Fox's American Dad!. Fogler also has had starring roles in ABC's Man Up! and Secrets & Lies, and appeared in a music video for Type O Negative's song "I Don't Wanna Be Me", in which he played a man recording himself on video cross-dressing as celebrities including Marilyn Monroe, Michael Jackson, Britney Spears and finally the band's singer Peter Steele.

In film, Fogler starred in 2007's Balls of Fury as Randy Daytona for Focus Features and in Lionsgate’s Good Luck Chuck with a role opposite Dane Cook and Jessica Alba. Fogler also had roles in Fanboys, Take Me Home Tonight, Scenic Route, Europa Report and the J. K. Rowling adaptation Fantastic Beasts and Where to Find Them, which was released worldwide in November 2016.

Fogler has done a variety of voiceover acting in films such as Horton Hears A Who! with Steve Carell and Jim Carrey, Disney's Mars Needs Moms, 2008's Kung Fu Panda with Jack Black and Jackie Chan, and the 2013 comedy Free Birds.

Fogler wrote and directed the play Elephant in the Room, inspired by Ionesco's Rhinoceros, which was produced by the New York International Fringe Festival in 2007. Fogler wrote and directed Hysterical Psycho (2009) which premiered at the 2009 Tribeca Film Festival, featuring actors from Stage 13, a film and theater production company of which Fogler is a founding member. Fogler wrote, directed, and starred in Don Peyote (2014) with supporting performances from Josh Duhamel, Anne Hathaway, and Topher Grace. In 2010, Archaia Entertainment published Fogler's first graphic novel, the horror anthology Moon Lake. This collection of stories chronicles the past, present, and future of the most haunted town on Earth: Moon Lake. Fogler's next graphic novel, Brooklyn Gladiator, was published in 2018 by Chapterhouse. Heavy Metal published Fogler's graphic novel Fishkill in 2020.

Personal life
In 2009, Fogler married Jodie Capes, co-founder of Capes Coaching, a career coaching company for actors and artists. They have two daughters, Edie and Franny. Fogler has lost  for the benefit of his family as he feared getting obesity-related diseases such as diabetes and high blood pressure.

Filmography

Film

Television

Video games

Music videos

Streaming

References

External links

 
 
 

1976 births
Living people
20th-century American male actors
21st-century American male actors
20th-century American comedians
21st-century American comedians
Male actors from New York City
American male comedians
American male film actors
American male television actors
American male musical theatre actors
American male stage actors
American male video game actors
American male voice actors
Drama Desk Award winners
Jewish American male comedians
Jewish American male actors
Theatre World Award winners
Tony Award winners
Boston University College of Fine Arts alumni
Poly Prep alumni
21st-century American Jews